The 1990 Florida Gators football team represented the University of Florida during the 1990 NCAA Division I-A football season. The season  marked the return of the Gators' Heisman Trophy-winning quarterback Steve Spurrier to his alma mater as the new head coach of the Florida Gators football team.

Spurrier's 1990 Florida Gators, while ineligible to win the SEC title or receive a bowl bid because of lingering NCAA probation, nevertheless posted a best-in-the-SEC record of 6–1 and an overall record of 9–2, and laid the foundation for the Gators' run of six SEC championships and a national title during the next decade.  They finished thirteenth in the season's final AP Poll.

Before the season
Just before Spurrier's Gator coaching debut, the Gainesville campus was rocked by the murders committed by Danny Rolling.

During Spurrier's first season, he was able to build on the strong talent recruited by departing Gators coach Galen Hall, but the Gators also reaped the benefits of Spurrier's "there are no excuses for losing" mantra.  Even as Spurrier's new "fun 'n' gun" offensive scheme led by quarterback Shane Matthews, wide receiver Ernie Mills and tight end Kirk Kirkpatrick was breaking team scoring and yardage records, defensive coordinator Jim Bates coached one of the best defensive squads in team history, including two first-team All-Americans, defensive end Huey Richardson and safety Will White.

Schedule

Personnel

Season summary

Oklahoma State

Combating the gloom, the Gators opened the season with a no-huddle, 80-yard touchdown drive in six plays to defeat the Oklahoma State Cowboys 50–7.

at Alabama

In their second game, the Gators came from behind to beat Alabama, a confidence-building, 17–13 signature road win, which set the tone for the remainder of the season,. Spurrier treasured the wins against the Crimson Tide: "Those victories early – '90, '91 – really got us started there at Florida ..." Alabama quarterback Gary Hollingsworth threw three interceptions to Florida safety Will White, and the Gators scored the winning touchdown on a blocked punt.

Furman

Florida then beat Furman 27–3.

Mississippi State

Building on the Alabama win, the Gators had a 34–21 conference victory over the Mississippi State Bulldogs.

LSU

Next, the Gators blew out the LSU Tigers 34–8.

Tennessee

The Gators suffered a disappointing  3–45 road loss to the fifth-ranked Tennessee Volunteers in Knoxville, Tennessee. In yet another link between the programs, Spurrier had been a star quarterback at Science Hill High School in Johnson City, Tennessee during the early 1960s.  Although Knoxville is nearby, he did not seriously consider attending UT because he was an excellent passer and the Vols ran a single-wing offense at the time which featured a running quarterback.  Instead, he choose to return to the state of his birth (Spurrier was born in Miami Beach), eventually becoming the Gators' first Heisman Trophy winner in 1966.

Spurrier's first Gator squad was 5–0 and ranked No. 9 coming into the matchup with Johnny Majors' 3–0–2 and No. 5 Vols, marking the first time in series history that both rivals were ranked in the AP top-10 when they faced off.  (It was not Spurrier’s first visit to Knoxville as an opposing coach; his 1988 Duke Blue Devils had upset the Vols 31–26.)

The 1990 game began as a defensive struggle, with UT holding a slim 7–3 lead at the half.  However, the Vols' Dale Carter returned the second half kickoff 91 yards for a touchdown, igniting the home crowd at Neyland Stadium.

On their ensuing possession, the Gators fumbled for what would be the first of six UF turnovers in the second half.  The opportunistic Vols took full advantage, turning Spurrier’s homecoming (and, coincidentally, UT's homecoming game) into a dominating 45–3 rout, the largest margin of victory for either team in the series.

Akron

Florida blanked Akron 59–0.

Auburn

Coach Pat Dye's 1990 Auburn Tigers were the defending three-time SEC champions, had built an undefeated 6−0−1 record, and were ranked fourth in the nation in the AP Poll.  Notwithstanding the fact that first-year coach Steve Spurrier's fifteenth-ranked Gators were three-point favorites, Dye had been publicly dismissive of Spurrier's pass-oriented offense before the game.  The Gators and Tigers were tied 7–7 after the first quarter, but Spurrier's Gators exploded for twenty-seven points in the second quarter, resulting in a 34–7 halftime lead and a 48–7 victory for the Gators, which was the Gators' biggest margin of victory in the series, and the worst loss of Dye's career.

Georgia

Florida's first win against Georgia since 1986, the Gators beat the Bulldogs 38–7 .

Kentucky

Florida beat the Kentucky Wildcats 47–15.

Florida State

The game was dubbed by some as the "Seminole Bowl" due to Florida's postseason ban.

Postseason
Matthews finished the season with 2,952 passing yards and twenty-three touchdowns—then the most passing yards in Gators history. He was SEC Player of the Year.

Before Spurrier returned to Gainesville, the Gators had never won an officially sanctioned Southeastern Conference (SEC) or national football championship (Florida's first SEC championship was in 1984, but was retroactively vacated by the SEC for infractions incurred by former head coach Charley Pell).   Before Spurrier resigned to seek a coaching position in the National Football League in January 2002, the Gators would win six SEC titles, play for two national championships, and win one in 1996.

References

Florida
Florida Gators football seasons
Florida Gators football